Joseph Gumilla (1686, in Cárcer – 1750, in the Llanos) was a Jesuit priest who wrote a natural history of the Orinoco River region.

Biography
In 1705 he left Spain for New Granada (today Colombia) where he studied at the Universidad Javeriana in Bogotá. He was ordained in 1714 and went to  the Orinoco Mission. In 1701 he went to Venezuela and worked there for 35 years.
He was sometime Rector of the School of Cartagena, Provincial Superior of New Granada, and Procurator in Rome from 1738. Here he wrote El Orinoco Ilustrado (Madrid, 1741). He returned to South America in 1743 with Filippo Salvatore Gilii. Gumilla introduced coffee into Venezuela in 1732. The beans were exported to Brazil.

References
Gumilla, (Padre) Joseph. El Orinoco ilustrado y defendido. Historia natural, civil y geográfica de este gran río y de sus caudalosas vertientes. Escrito en 1731. Ediciones posteriores: 1745, 1791 y 1882. Versión francesa, 1758. Caracas: Academia Nacional de la Historia, Fuentes para la Historia Colonial de Venezuela, Nº 68, 1963.
Gumilla, José. Tribus indígenas del Orinoco. Caracas: Instituto Nacional de Cooperación Educativa (I.N.C.E.), 1968.
Ramos Perez, Demetrio. Un plan de inmigración y libre comercio defendido por Gumilla para Guayana en 1739. Anuario de Estudios Americanos, Tomo XV, 1958.

External links
Jesuit Stamps Portrait on a postage stamp.

Spanish naturalists
1686 births
1750 deaths
18th-century Spanish Jesuits